Six Mile is located in the Saraga suburb on the eastern edge of Port Moresby, the capital city of Papua New Guinea.

The Civil Aviation Safety Authority of Papua New Guinea has its headquarters in Six Mile.

References

Suburbs of Port Moresby